Único is the 13th album of music by Mexican female rock singer Alejandra Guzmán.  The album's songs were influenced by British Rock; it was recorded in 2008 in several studios including Nashville and London.  It was released in 2009. It contains a covers of Dolcenera's song Il mio amore unico.

Track listing
"No voy a esperar" (Mario Domm, Monica Velez)
"Mentiras piadosas" (Jerry Demara)
"Rezo (I Pray)" (Ivan Sevillano Pérez "Huecco")
"Amor en suspenso (Crocodile Tears)" (Roxanne Seeman, Philipp Steinke, Alejandra Guzman, Fernando Osorio)
"Ahogada en tu tristeza" (Jose Portilla & Marco Olivera)
"Algo que no está" (Franco de Vita & Jeremías)
"Ella" (Alejandra Guzmán, Jose Luis Pagan)
"¿Por qué no estás aqui?" (Jose Luis Pagan, Alejandra Guzmán)
"Único (Il mio amore unico)" (O. Avogadro, Emanuela Trane, G.P. Ameli & S. Lanza)
"No importa la hora" (Graeme Pleeth, Alejandra Guzmán)

Singles

Sales and certifications
Weekly charts

Year-end charts

Sales

References

2009 albums
Alejandra Guzmán albums
Pop rock albums by Mexican artists
Spanish-language albums